Amine Ferid Gouiri (born 16 February 2000) is a French professional footballer who plays as a striker for Ligue 1 club Rennes.

Club career

Lyon
A player of Lyon starting in 2013, Gouiri signed his first professional contract with the club on 3 July 2017 for three years.

An internationally renowned prospect, Gouiri made the bench for Lyon in a Ligue 1 match against Bordeaux on 10 September 2016 at the age of 16, and debuted for the Lyon B team at the age of 17. He made his first team debut on 19 November 2017 in a 0–0 home draw against Montpellier in Ligue 1. He entered the field after 73 minutes replacing Tanguy Ndombele.

Nice
On 1 July 2020, Gouiri joined fellow Ligue 1 side Nice on a four-year contract for a fee of €7 million. On 23 August 2020, he scored two goals in his first competitive match for Nice, in a 2–1 league home win over newly promoted Lens, becoming the club's youngest player in the last 70 years to have scored at least twice in his club debut in the French top flight. On 29 October 2020, he scored the only goal in a 1–0 win over Hapoel Be'er Sheva in the 2020–21 UEFA Europa League.

Rennes 
On 1 September 2022, Gouiri joined Rennes on a five-year contract until 30 June 2027.

International career
A youth international for France, Gouiri was the top scorer at the 2017 UEFA European Under-17 Championship, scoring 7 goals and was the top scorer in the tournament. After his success in the tournament, Gouiri garnered attention of various European clubs and was rated one of the best young talents in the world by The Guardian.

Gouri also represented France at the 2017 FIFA U-17 World Cup in India, scoring a brace in his debut in the tournament against the New Caledonia U17s. In total, he scored five goals in the tournament.

At the 2018 UEFA U19 Euro, Gouiri scored two consecutive braces against Turkey and England, in the second and third matches of the group stage, respectively.

Personal life
Gouiri was born in France and is of Algerian descent.

Career statistics

Honours
Lyon
 Coupe de la Ligue runner-up: 2019–20

Nice
 Coupe de France runner-up: 2021–22

Individual
UEFA European Under-17 Championship Top Scorer: 2017
UEFA European Under-17 Championship Team of the Tournament: 2017

References

External links

OL Web Profile

2000 births
Living people
People from Bourgoin-Jallieu
Sportspeople from Isère
French footballers
France youth international footballers
France under-21 international footballers
Association football forwards
FC Bourgoin-Jallieu players
Olympique Lyonnais players
OGC Nice players
Stade Rennais F.C. players
Ligue 1 players
French sportspeople of Algerian descent
Footballers from Auvergne-Rhône-Alpes